IJK or ijk may refer to:
 IJK (singer songwriter) (born 1981), Lebanese singer-songwriter
 Haplogroup IJK
 Indhiya Jananayaga Katchi, a political party in Tamil Nadu, India
 International Youth Congress
 Izhevsk Airport, serving Udmurtia, Russia
 A convention of naming the axis of Euclidean vectors.
 In computer science, i, j, k; a common naming convention for the loop counter used in for loops.